Theodor Gustav Alwin Adolf Maennchen (7 September 1860, Rudolstadt - 30 March 1920, Düsseldorf) was a German landscape and genre painter.

Life and work 
He was born to Carl Maennchen, a Master tanner, and his wife, Emilie née Güntsche. His younger brother, also becane a painter.

After serving an apprenticeship as a decorative painter, he spent his journeyman years wandering through Germany and Austria and plying his trade. In 1883, he became a full-time student at the Berlin University of the Arts, which he attended until 1888. His instructors there included , Paul Thumann, Otto Knille and Eugen Bracht.

He continued to work as a decorative painter while studying and, upon graduating, was able to make a study trip to Italy and North Africa. He travelled whenever possible; visiting Switzerland, the Netherlands and France. In Paris, he attended the Académie Julian, where he took lessons from Jules-Joseph Lefebvre and Tony Robert-Fleury.

In 1896, he was awarded a small gold medal at the Große Berliner Kunstausstellung. He received another gold medal at the Exposition Universelle (1900), and held a major exhibition at the Glaspalast in 1901.

The following year, he was named a Professor and head of the drawing classes at the Kunstakademie Düsseldorf. He held those positions until 1918.

References

Further reading 
 
 "Maennchen, Adolf",  In: Friedrich von Boetticher: Malerwerke des 19. Jahrhunderts. Beitrag zur Kunstgeschichte, Vol.1/2, Heideck–Mayer, Boetticher’s Verlag, Dresden 1895, pp. 928–929 (Online)
 "Maennchen, Adolf", In: Allgemeines Lexikon der Bildenden Künstler von der Antike bis zur Gegenwart, Vol. 23: Leitenstorfer–Mander, E. A. Seemann, Leipzig 1929

External links 

1860 births
1920 deaths
19th-century German painters
19th-century German male artists
German genre painters
German landscape painters
Berlin University of the Arts alumni
Academic staff of Kunstakademie Düsseldorf
People from Rudolstadt
20th-century German painters
20th-century German male artists